The Roving Shadows is a 2002 fiction book by the French writer Pascal Quignard. It won the Prix Goncourt. The English edition, translated by Chris Turner, was published in November 2011.

See also
 2002 in literature
 Contemporary French literature

References

2002 French novels
French-language novels
Novels by Pascal Quignard
Prix Goncourt winning works
Éditions Grasset books